José Luciano de Castro Pereira Corte-Real (14 December 1834 – 9 March 1914) was a Portuguese politician, statesman, and journalist who served three times as Prime Minister of Portugal. He was one of the founders of the Progressist Party, of which he was the leader from the time of Anselmo José Braamcamp's death in 1885, onward.

Castro was the head of government during the Pink Map crisis and the subsequent 1890 British Ultimatum. The crisis was one of the factors that proved decisive in the fall of the Portuguese constitutional monarchy on 5 October 1910.

References

1834 births
1914 deaths
People from Aveiro, Portugal
Progressive Party (Portugal) politicians
Prime Ministers of Portugal
19th-century Portuguese people